St. Mary's and St Jude Orthodox Syrian Church, Kazhakootam (Kazhakuttom)  is a parish under the Thiruvananthapuram diocese of the Malankara Orthodox Syrian Church. This church was founded 2 years back as a chapel. The Diocesan Bishop Gabriel Mar Greegorious declared it as a Parish in August 2011 and appointed Joseph Samuel Karukayil Cor-Episcopa as the founder vicar.

References

Malankara Orthodox Syrian church buildings